The Israeli General Corps is the Israel Defense Forces authority responsible for those soldiers which do not belong to any corps.

It is headed by the Head of the Personnel Directorate's Staff Division, currently Brigadier General Yossi Matzliach.

Units
The General Corps manages or advises the following major units, but the units are not necessarily subordinate to the corps:
 Military Advocate General
 IDF Spokesperson's Unit
 Coordinator of Government Activities in the Territories
 IDF Budget Department
 Behavior Sciences Center
 IDF International Cooperation Division
 Soldiers' Ombudsman's Unit
 Administration for non-IDF soldiers in mandatory service, including service in the Defense Ministry, Prime Minister's Office, Israel Police, etc.

Corps of Israel